Kelly Louise Wilson (born 1 January 1984) is an Australian professional basketball player for the Canberra Capitals of the Women's National Basketball League (WNBL).

Early life
Wilson was born in Melbourne, Victoria, and grew up in the Victorian country town of Leongatha. She played her junior basketball for Leongatha Basketball Association.

Career

WNBL
Wilson made her WNBL debut with the Australian Institute of Sport (AIS) in 2002 and won the WNBL Rookie of the Year. She played for the Sydney Uni Flames between 2003 and 2005, and the Townsville Fire between 2005 and 2008. She played the next eight seasons for the Bendigo Spirit, winning championships in 2013 and 2014. She returned to the Fire in 2016 and played two seasons, winning a third championship in 2018. For the 2018–19 season, she played for the Canberra Capitals and won her fourth championship. For the 2019–20 season, she returned to the Spirit. In January 2020, Wilson broke the WNBL's all-time games played record, when she took to the court in her 395th game, beating the previous record-holder, Jessica Bibby.

After sitting out the 2020 hub season due to the birth of her first child, Wilson returned to the Canberra Capitals for the 2021–22 season. In January 2022, she played her 400th WNBL game.

State Leagues
Wilson debuted in the South East Australian Basketball League (SEABL) in 2001 for the Nunawading Spectres. She played a second season for the Spectres in 2002. She played in the Waratah League over the next two years, first with the Sydney Comets in 2003 and then with the Sutherland Sharks in 2004. She returned to the SEABL in 2005 to play for the Bendigo Braves.

In 2006, Wilson played for the Townsville Flames in the Queensland Basketball League (QBL) and was named the Sunstate Division U23 Youth Player of the Year. She returned to QBL in 2008 with the Mackay Meteorettes and was named league MVP.

Wilson returned to the SEABL in 2009 and won the league MVP with the Bendigo Braves. After being cut by the Braves following three seasons, she joined the Knox Raiders in 2012, going on to win the SEABL championship and her second league MVP in 2013. After three seasons with Knox, she returned to Bendigo in 2015 and in 2018 won her second SEABL championship. She played for the Braves in the inaugural NBL1 season in 2019, winning the league MVP. She had a short stint with the Braves during the 2021 NBL1 South season.

National team
Wilson made her international debut for Australia in 2003. In 2007, she was part of the historic Emerging Opals team that claimed the gold medal at the World University Games in Bangkok, Thailand. She earned a national team call-up in 2013 to help Australia win the FIBA Oceania Championships.

Personal life
Wilson's sister Andrea also plays in the WNBL.

Notes

References

External links
Basketball Australia profile

1984 births
Australian Institute of Sport basketball (WNBL) players
Australian women's basketball players
Bendigo Spirit players
Canberra Capitals players
Guards (basketball)
Living people
Medalists at the 2007 Summer Universiade
Sydney Uni Flames players
Townsville Fire players
Universiade gold medalists for Australia
Universiade medalists in basketball